Michael Stolberg (born 27 March 1992) is an Australian rugby player currently playing for the Kintetsu Liners in the Japanese Top League Competition.

Rugby career 
Stolberg's first representative honour was in 2007 with selection in the Queensland Under 15 team. From here he was identified and offered a scholarship from the Anglican Church Grammar School. During his two years at The Anglican Church Grammar School he was a member of the ARU National Talent Squad.

Stolberg joined Easts Rugby Union in 2010 and played one year of Premier Colts and continued with the club's Premier Grade team from 2011 - 2013. During this time he was a member of the Queensland Reds Academy for 2011 and the ARU's National Academy from 2012-2013.

In 2014 Stolberg was signed by the Northland Rugby Union to play in New Zealand's ITM Cup (now Mitre10 Cup) and continued with the club for the 2015 season.

Stolberg joined the Kintetsu Liners in the Japanese Top League for the 2016/17 season and played the 2017/18, 2018/19, 2019/20 and 2020/21 seasons for them. Michael captained a number of games for the Kintetsu Liners in the 2019/20 season and captained all games during the 2020/21 season.

In May 2021 Kintetsu announced Stolberg was leaving the team.

Professional statistics 
As of 16 December 2019.

Super Rugby statistics

References 

Living people
Australian rugby union players
1992 births
Northland rugby union players
Australian expatriate rugby union players
Expatriate rugby union players in New Zealand
Hanazono Kintetsu Liners players
Expatriate rugby union players in Japan
Melbourne Rebels players
Sunwolves players
Black Rams Tokyo players
Rugby union locks